Tønsberg Cathedral is a Lutheran church located in Tønsberg, Norway. It is the episcopal seat of the Diocese of Tunsberg within the Church of Norway. Originally a parish church, it was elevated to cathedral status in 1948 when the Diocese of Tunsberg was created, detached from the Diocese of Oslo. The cathedral has space for 550 seats.

History and description
The cathedral is built over the ruins of St. Laurentius' Church (Laurentiuskirken), which was built in the first half of the 12th century and demolished in 1814. It is a Brick Gothic church, originally designed by the architect Christian Heinrich Grosch and completed in 1858 on the site of the ancient church. The cathedral of Tønsberg was dedicated by Bishop Jens Lauritz Arup on 19 December 1858. The cathedral was remodeled in 1939 with a restoration led by architect Arnstein Arneberg.

The cathedral is richly carved including figures representing the four Evangelists and their personal symbols. The Baroque altar was carved by Jens Jølsen in 1764. The altarpiece shows Jesus' struggle at Gethsemane. It was painted in 1760 by Jacob Pederssøn Lindgaard (1719–1789). The pulpit, created by unknown local artisans, is from 1621.   The cathedral also owns two 16th-century Holy Bibles, one from 1550 and one from 1589. The baptismal font is by sculptor Christopher Borch (1817–1896) and was donated by Svend Foyn. In the grounds of the cathedral, a bronze statue of Svend Foyn by the sculptor Anders Svor (1864–1929) was unveiled in 1915.

See also 
 List of cathedrals in Norway

References

External links

 Tønsberg Domkirke Website

C
Cathedrals in Norway
Lutheran cathedrals in Norway
1858 establishments in Norway